Bashneft – Ufimsky refinery plant   is one of the most up-to-date oil refineries in Russia which can produce a wide range of high-quality petroleum products.

The technological workflow of the refinery ensures complex and deep oil refining using highly efficient thermic, catalytic and hydrogenation processes. The refinery's modern technological equipment produces Euro-4 and Euro-5 fuels, boiler fuel as well as a wide range of liquefied gases.

To achieve 100% output of Euro-4 and Euro-5 automobile gasoline, a catalytic cracking gasoline hydrotreater for removal of sulphur compounds is being constructed at Bashneft – Ufimsky refinery plant. In the future the plant plans to construct a delayed coker which will enable to achieve a refining depth of 95%.

References

Companies based in Ufa
Oil refineries in Russia
1937 establishments in the Soviet Union
Oil refineries in the Soviet Union